Taizu is a temple name typically, but not always, used for Chinese monarchs who founded a particular dynasty. It may refer to:

 Emperor Gaozu of Han (256 BC or 247 BC – 195 BC)
 Sun Quan (182–252) of Eastern Wu
 Liu Yuan (Han Zhao) (251–310) of Han Zhao
 Tuoba Yulü (died in 321) of State of Dai
 Murong Huang (297–348) of Former Yan
 Shi Hu (295–349) of Later Zhao
 Yao Chang (331–394) of Later Qin
 Lü Guang (337–400) of Later Liang (Sixteen Kingdoms)
 Emperor Daowu of Northern Wei (371–409)
 Li Gao (351–417) of Western Liang (Sixteen Kingdoms)
 Qifu Chipan (died in 428) of Western Qin
 Feng Ba (died in 430) of Northern Yan
 Juqu Mengxun (368–433) of Northern Liang
 Emperor Wen of Liu Song (407–453)
 Emperor Gao of Southern Qi (427–482) of Southern Qi
 Zhu Wen (852–912) of Later Liang (Five Dynasties)
 Wang Shenzhi (862–925) of Min (Ten Kingdoms)
 Abaoji (872–926) of the Liao dynasty
 Qian Liu (852–932) of Wuyue
 Duan Siping (893–944) of the Dali Kingdom
 Guo Wei (904–954) of Later Zhou
 Emperor Taizu of Song (927–976)
 Emperor Taizu of Jin (1068–1123)
 Hongwu Emperor (1328–1398) of the Ming dynasty
 Ming Yuzhen (1331–1366) of Great Xia
 Wu Sangui (1612–1678) of Great Zhou

It may also refer to those who never officially declared themselves as emperors, but were posthumously given the title by their imperial descendants:
 Cao Cao (155-220), Emperor Taizu of Cao Wei (220–265)
 Sima Zhao (211–265), King of Jin 
 Zhang Gui (255–314), Emperor Taizu of Former Liang (320–376)
 Fu Hong (284–350), Emperor Taizu of Former Qin (351–394)
 Huan Wen (312–373), Emperor Taizu of Huan Chu (403–404)
 Liu Weichen (died in 391), Emperor Taizu of Hu Xia (407–431)
 Xiao Shunzhi (fl. 477–482), Emperor Taizu of the Liang dynasty (502–557)
 Gao Huan (496–547), Emperor Taizu of Northern Qi (550–577)
 Yuwen Tai (507–556), Emperor Taizu of Northern Zhou (557–581)
 Chen Wenzhan (died before 557), Emperor Taizu of the Chen dynasty (557–589)
 Yang Zhong (507–568), Emperor Taizu of the Sui dynasty (581–618)
 Li Hu (died in 551), Emperor Taizu of the Tang dynasty (618–907)
 Wu Shihuo (559–635), Emperor Taizu of Southern Zhou (690–705)
 Yang Xingmi (852–905), Emperor Taizu of Wu (Ten Kingdoms) (907–937)
 Liu Anren (died before 917), Emperor Taizu of Southern Han (917–971)
 Li Keyong (856–908), Emperor Taizu of Later Tang (923–936)
 Meng Yi (Tang dynasty) (died before 934), Emperor Taizu of Later Shu (934–965)
 Xu Wen (862–927), Emperor Taizu of Southern Tang (937–975)
 Li Jiqian (963–1004), Emperor Taizu of Western Xia (1038–1227)
 Genghis Khan (1162?–1227), Emperor Taizu of the Yuan dynasty (1271–1368)
 Nurhaci (1559–1626), Emperor Taizu of the Qing dynasty (1636–1912)
Ancient Chinese institutions

See also 
 Taejo (disambiguation) (Korean equivalent)
 Thái Tổ (disambiguation) (Vietnamese equivalent)
 Gaozu (disambiguation) (similar meaning; some emperors have been called both)
 Shizu (disambiguation)
 Taizong (disambiguation)

Temple name disambiguation pages